The 2010–11 season was the 131st season in Doncaster Rovers Football Club's existence, and their third consecutive year in the Championship, the second tier of English football.

Pre-season

Doncaster's first pre-season friendly was an away game against local team Askern Miners. They hosted newly promoted Premier League new boys West Bromwich Albion at the Keepmoat Stadium on 27 July, followed by a trip by local rivals and recently relegated Sheffield Wednesday on 31 July, again at the Keepmoat.

Players

First team

Players' ages are as of the opening day of the 2010–11 season.

Squad statistics

|}

Results

Championship

FA Cup

League Cup

Team kit
Doncaster Rovers were sponsored by Nike, after their deal with previous sponsor Vandanal expired. Their shirt sponsor changed to One Call Insurance who previously sponsored the club during their days in the Football Conference.

Transfers

In
First team

Reserves and academy

Total spending:  £1.15 million

Out
First team

Reserves and academy

Total income:  £0 million

Loaned in

Loaned out

References

Doncaster Rovers F.C. seasons
Doncaster Rovers